Zdenka Bujnáčková (born 25 April 1955) is a Slovak gymnast. She competed at the 1972 Summer Olympics.

References

External links
 

1955 births
Living people
Slovak female artistic gymnasts
Olympic gymnasts of Czechoslovakia
Gymnasts at the 1972 Summer Olympics
Sportspeople from Bratislava